Raran (also Romanized as Rārān; also known as Rādān and Rārān Qahāb) is a village in Jey Rural District, in the Central District of Isfahan County, Isfahan Province, Iran. At the 2006 census, its population was 2,032, in 554 families.

References 

Populated places in Isfahan County